During the 1907–08 English football season, Brentford competed in the Southern League First Division. A poor season ended with a 16th-place finish.

Season summary 

Though Brentford manager William Brown managed to retain most of his key players for the 1907–08 season, his release of future England international forward Fred Pentland was seen as being ill-advised. In came goalkeeper John Montgomery, full back Vince Hayes, half back Jock Hamilton and centre forward Adam Bowman. Brentford started the Southern League First Division season poorly and with the club entering a period of financial instability, the relationship between the committee and the players began to deteriorate. Hopes of a money-spinning FA Cup run ended in the first round at the hands of Lancashire Combination club Carlisle United and in January 1908 manager Brown tendered his resignation, which was accepted.

Captain George Parsonage was named as player-caretaker manager in January 1908 and after reshuffling the lineup, he oversaw an upturn in form which led the Bees to a 16th-place finish. One of the highlights of a dreadful season was the goalscoring of forward Adam Bowman, who scored 22 goals in all competitions before being sold to Leeds City for £300 in April. There was some cheer to be had in the United League, in which the first team won the division title, while the reserve team finished the season as Great Western Suburban League champions.

The season marked a beginning of a period of financial trouble for Brentford, with Fulham's election to the Football League and Chelsea's home fixtures clashing with those at Griffin Park conspiring to draw potential support in West London away from the Bees. By mid-April 1908, the club owed its players £500 in unpaid wages (equivalent to £ in ), which necessitated the sale of top-scorer Bowman.

One club record was set during the season:
 Most Southern League away defeats in a season: 16

League table

Results
Brentford's goal tally listed first.

Legend

Southern League First Division

FA Cup 

 Source: 100 Years of Brentford

Playing squad

Left club during season

 Source: 100 Years of Brentford, The Football Association

Coaching staff

William Brown (3 September 1907 – January 1908)

George Parsonage ( – 25 January April 1908)

Statistics

Appearances

Goalscorers 

Players listed in italics left the club mid-season.
Source: 100 Years Of Brentford

Summary

References 

Brentford F.C. seasons
Brentford